The Château de Sauvebœuf  is a château in the commune of Aubas, Dordogne, Nouvelle-Aquitaine, France.

References 

Châteaux in Dordogne
Monuments historiques of Dordogne